The Guyana national under-17 football team, nicknamed the Golden Jaguars, represents Guyana in international football and is controlled by the Guyana Football Federation. The team compete in the FIFA U-17 World Cup and regional tournament CONCACAF U-17 Championship

History

Players
The following squad was recently announced for youth friendly matches.

Recent results & fixtures
The following is a list of match results from the previous 12 months, as well as any future matches that have been scheduled.

Legend

2019

Competitive records

FIFA U-17 World Cup

CONCACAF U-17 Championship

References

External links

 
South American national under-17 association football teams
Caribbean national under-17 association football teams
Football in Guyana
under-17